Friedrich Raas (31 January 1895 – after 1923), commonly known as Fritz, was a Swiss footballer who played for FC Basel. He played mainly as a midfielder, but also as a forward.

Football career
Between the years 1915 and 1921 Raas played 23 games for Basel without scoring; 11 games were in the Swiss Serie A and 12 were friendly games.

References

Sources
 Rotblau: Jahrbuch Saison 2017/2018. Publisher: FC Basel Marketing AG. 
 Die ersten 125 Jahre. Publisher: Josef Zindel im Friedrich Reinhardt Verlag, Basel. 
 Verein "Basler Fussballarchiv" Homepage

FC Basel players
Swiss men's footballers
Association football midfielders
Association football forwards
1895 births
Year of death missing